10,000 Towns is the fourth studio album by American country music group Eli Young Band. It was released on March 4, 2014 via Republic Nashville. The band wrote over half the tracks and co-produced the album with Frank Liddell and Justin Niebank. It includes the number one single "Drunk Last Night." An exclusive version of the album with three bonus tracks is available at Walmart.

Background
Lead singer Mike Eli said of the album: "To still be making music and going through the craziness of life together is something we'd only dreamed of when we met back in college. This album shows another chapter in our lives as a band, as husbands, as fathers and as individuals that we're really excited to share with our amazing fans."

Critical reception

10,000 Towns has received positive reviews from music critics. At USA Today, Brian Mansfield rated the album three out of four stars, stating "That keeps their populist country and heartland rock from setting down roots, but lets these songs resonate everywhere." Stephen Thomas Erlewine of AllMusic rated the album three out of five stars, writing that "their strength lies in the sweeter stuff, how they can make crossover country-pop that seems amiable but never cloying." At The Oakland Press, Gary Graff rated the album two-and-a-half stars out of four, saying that the release "touts the virtues of lowest-common-denominator country, filled with sweet melodies, rich vocal harmonies and a careful straddle of the twang/rock divide to maintain its crossover candidacy." Bob Paxman of Country Weekly graded the album a B, and said that the release is "decent but not quite up to the level of those two powerhouses." At Roughstock, Matt Bjorke rated the album four-and-a-half stars out of five, saying that the album "suggests that [the] Eli Young Band has found the right formula for their sound."

Track listing

Personnel
Adapted from liner notes.

Eli Young Band
Mike Eli- lead vocals
Jon Jones- bass guitar, background vocals
Chris Thompson- drums, percussion
James Young- electric guitar, background vocals

Additional Musicians
Tom Bukovac- electric guitar
J.T. Corenflos- electric guitar
Eric Darken- percussion
Dan Dugmore- steel guitar
Kenny Greenberg- acoustic guitar, electric guitar
Tony Harrell- keyboards
Wes Hightower- background vocals
David Huff- programming
Charlie Judge- accordion, Hammond B-3 organ, keyboards, piano, synthesizer, synthesizer strings, Wurlitzer
Tony Lucido- bass guitar
Jerry McPherson- electric guitar
Heather Morgan- background vocals
Greg Morrow- percussion
Justin Niebank- keyboards, programming
Russ Pahl- steel guitar
Danny Rader- accordion, bouzouki, acoustic guitar, mandolin
Cale Richardson- acoustic guitar, Hammond B-3 organ, piano
Adam Shoenfeld- electric guitar
Ilya Toshinsky- acoustic guitar

Chart performance
10,000 Towns debuted at No. 5 on the Billboard 200 and No. 1 on the Top Country Albums chart with first week sales of 36,000 copies.  The album has sold 95,000 copies in the U.S. as of January 2015.

Weekly charts

Year-end charts

Singles

References

2014 albums
Eli Young Band albums
Republic Records albums
Albums produced by Frank Liddell